You Chin Hong (born 4 June 1941) is a Cambodian boxer. He competed in the men's lightweight event at the 1964 Summer Olympics. At the 1964 Summer Olympics, he lost in his first fight to Alex Odhiambo of Uganda.

References

External links
 

1941 births
Living people
Cambodian male boxers
Olympic boxers of Cambodia
Boxers at the 1964 Summer Olympics
Place of birth missing (living people)
Asian Games medalists in boxing
Boxers at the 1962 Asian Games
Asian Games bronze medalists for Cambodia
Medalists at the 1962 Asian Games
Lightweight boxers